The 2021 American Athletic Conference men's soccer tournament was the ninth edition of the conference tournament, the annual college soccer championship contested by the members of the American Athletic Conference and guaranteed representative into the 2021 NCAA Division I men's soccer tournament.  The tournament, hosted by Tulsa, began on November 10, 2021, and concluded on November 14, 2021.

Format
The tournament took place in November 2021 and was contested by the top four teams in the regular season standing.

Qualified teams

Bracket

Matches

Semifinals

Final

Goalscorers

All-Tournament team

References

Tournament
American Athletic Conference men's soccer
American Athletic Conference Men's Soccer Tournament
American Athletic Conference Men's Soccer Tournament
Sports in Tulsa, Oklahoma
American Athletic Conference Men's Soccer Tournament